Spirit is the second studio album by Indonesian rock band J-Rocks, released on 2007 in Indonesia by Aquarius Musikindo.

Track listing

2007 albums
J-Rocks albums